Gimmick is a novelty feature in marketing, magic/illusion, and psychology.

Gimmick may also refer to:

 Gimmick (professional wrestling), a professional wrestling term
 Gimmick!, a 1992 video game developed by Sunsoft
 Gimmick! (manga), a 2005–2007 manga series
 Gimmicks, toy-like weapons in the 2002 video game, Tomato Adventure
 Gimmick capacitor, a capacitor made by twisting two insulated wires together
 Gimmick (album), a 1993 album by Barkmarket
 "Gimmick", a song by Gunna from the album Wunna
Gimmick (film), a 2019 Kannada film

See also
 Gimik, 1995-6 Filipino television show
 gímik, Japanese anime production group